King is a city in Stokes and Forsyth counties, North Carolina, United States. The population was 7,096 at the 2020 census. King is part of the Piedmont Triad metropolitan area, located 15 miles northwest of Winston-Salem. Dairi-O, a local fast food restaurant, is one of the cities staples. Around since the 1950’s, it has grown to be one of the best restaurants in the triad area.

The city has two large public parks: Recreation Acres and Central Park.

Geography
King is located in southern Stokes County, with parts of the city limits extending south into Forsyth County. U.S. Route 52, a four-lane freeway, passes through the city south and west of the center, with access from Exit 123.

History
The town was originally called "King's Cabin". Charles and Francis King lived in a cabin owned by Francis's father for a short time in the 1830s. Being Quakers and against slavery, the King family moved to the free North. According to television journalist and historian Chad Tucker's book Images of America, King (2006), after the King family left their home it was used by locals as a landmark or reference point in giving directions. Several decades later when a post office was established in 1888 it was named for that reference point, King's Cabin. The railroad laid tracks a few years later and shortened the name to "King" in its business transactions, and to eliminate confusion the post office followed on September 26, 1894. Charles and Francis King never returned to Stokes County and never knew their former home became the namesake of a town.

According to Tucker, the community grew into an unincorporated town of schools and businesses. With the first automobile arriving by train in October 1911, new highways followed. With new roads, the town's proximity to Winston-Salem, and a new four-lane Highway 52 built in the 1960s, King opened its doors to growth, turning farmland into subdivisions. Community groups acted as an unofficial town council, providing services such as a fire department, water and sewer. On September 13, 1983, King became an incorporated city, 95 years after the King's Cabin post office opened.

The King Historic District and Rock House are listed on the National Register of Historic Places.

Education

High school
 West Stokes High School

Private School
 Calvary Christian School

Demographics

2020 census

As of the 2020 United States census, there were 7,197 people, 2,956 households, and 1,954 families residing in the city.

2010 census
As of the census of 2010, there were 6,904 people, and 2,503 households, residing in the city. The racial makeup of the city was 97.73% White, 2.59% African American, 0.13% Native American, 0.57% Asian, 0.02% Pacific Islander, 0.34% from other races, and 0.62% from two or more races. Hispanic or Latino of any race were 2.05% of the population.

Notable people
 Kyle Hall, member of the North Carolina General Assembly
 Rex L. Baker, former member of the North Carolina General Assembly
 Tom Baker, professional bowler
 Billy J. Boles, retired United States Air Force four-star general
 Sam Gibson, former MLB pitcher
 William C. McGee, former member of the North Carolina General Assembly

References

External links
 City of King official website
 King Chamber of Commerce
 American Towns Features King, NC

Cities in North Carolina
Cities in Forsyth County, North Carolina
Populated places established in 1888